That Man may refer to:

 "That Man" (song), a 2010 song by Caro Emerald
 That Man, an Excel Saga character
 That Man, a Guilty Gear character
 That Man in the White House, used to describe Franklin D. Roosevelt

See also

 The Man